Hippobroma longiflora, also called Star of Bethlehem or madamfate, is a flowering plant in the family Campanulaceae. It is the only species in the genus Hippobroma. It is endemic to the West Indies, but has become naturalized across the American tropics and Oceania.

It is notable for its concentrations of two pyridine alkaloids: lobeline and nicotine. The effects of nicotine and lobeline are quite similar, with psychoactive effects at small dosages and with unpleasant effects including vomiting, muscle paralysis, and trembling at higher dosages. For this reason, H. longiflora (and its various synonyms) is often referenced for both its toxicity and its ethnobotanical uses.

When uprooting this weed, it is important to wear gloves: the sap is an irritant which can be absorbed through the skin, and a small amount of sap in the eyes can cause blindness.

References

Lobelioideae
Monotypic Campanulaceae genera
Entheogens